Murray Goldfinch (born 16 March 1984 in Sydney, New South Wales)   is a Paralympic athletics competitor with an intellectual disability from Canberra, Australia.  He won a bronze medal at the 2000 Sydney Games in the men's shot put F20 event. In 2001, he held an Australian Institute of Sport athletics scholarship.

References

External links
 Murray Goldfinch - Athletics Australia Results

Paralympic athletes of Australia
Athletes (track and field) at the 2000 Summer Paralympics
Paralympic bronze medalists for Australia
Australian Institute of Sport Paralympic track and field athletes
Living people
Medalists at the 2000 Summer Paralympics
1984 births
ACT Academy of Sport alumni
Paralympic medalists in athletics (track and field)
Australian male shot putters